Chahardeh Rural District is a rural district (dehestan) in the Central District of Astaneh-ye Ashrafiyeh County, Gilan Province, Iran. At the 2006 census, its population was 4,214, in 1,392 families. The rural district has 8 villages.

References 

Rural Districts of Gilan Province
Astaneh-ye Ashrafiyeh County